The 1966–67 Balkans Cup was an edition of the Balkans Cup, a football competition for representative clubs from the Balkan states. It was contested by 8 teams and Fenerbahçe won the trophy.

Group A

Group B

Finals

|}

First leg

Second leg

Play–off

Fenerbahçe won the play-off 3–1.

References

External links 
RSSSF Archive → Balkans Cup
 
 Mehmet Çelik. "Balkan Cup". Turkish Soccer

1966-67
1966–67 in European football
1967–68 in European football
1966–67 in Romanian football
1967–68 in Romanian football
1966–67 in Greek football
1967–68 in Greek football
1966–67 in Bulgarian football
1967–68 in Bulgarian football
1966–67 in Turkish football
1967–68 in Turkish football
1966–67 in Yugoslav football
1967–68 in Yugoslav football
1966–67 in Albanian football
1967–68 in Albanian football